Satellite of Earth may refer to:
 Moon, the natural satellite of Earth
 Artificial satellites orbiting the Earth